Higher Boscaswell is a hamlet near Pendeen in west Cornwall, England. It is east of Pendeen and on the B road from St Ives to St Just. Higher Boscaswell is included in the St Just in Penwith division on Cornwall Council.

References

Hamlets in Cornwall
St Just in Penwith